D 73, also known as Al Dhiyafa Road or 2nd Zabeel Road is a road in Dubai, United Arab Emirates.  The road originates in Jumeirah, running south-eastward perpendicular to D 94 (Jumeirah Road).  D 73 borders the localities of Al Jafilia and Satwa. The road's intersection with E 11 (Sheikh Zayed Road) near Zabeel forms the Trade Centre Roundabout.

Important landmarks along the D 73 route include Union House, Jumeirah Rotana Hotel, Rydges Plaza, The Monarch Dubai, Etisalat Tower 2 and the Dubai World Trade Centre.

References

Roads in the United Arab Emirates
Transport in Dubai